South & City College Birmingham is a further education and higher education college in Birmingham, England, providing full-time and part-time courses. It was previously known as South Birmingham College and City College Birmingham before the merger.

History

South & City College Birmingham is the result of a merger between South Birmingham College and City College Birmingham; South Birmingham College officially changed its name to South & City College Birmingham on Wednesday 1 August 2012. On Wednesday 2 August 2017, South & City College Birmingham merged again with Bournville College. The college has a total of 8 campuses, and they accept students who are aged 14 and over.

The college used to have campuses in many areas; some campuses have now permanently closed such as: Balsall Heath Women's Centre, Ladywood Campus, Tyseley Campus and the original location of the Fusion Centre.

Every academic year, South & City College Birmingham provides education and training to over 20,000 students.

Campuses
Below is a list of the 8 campuses:

 1. Longbridge Campus: 1 Longbridge Lane, Longbridge, Birmingham B31 2AJ (Sat Nav B31 2TW)
 2. Longbridge Construction & Building Services Centre: 3 Devon Way, Longbridge, Birmingham B31 2TS
 3. Bordersley Green Campus: Fordrough Lane, Bordersley Green, Birmingham B9 5NA
 4. Digbeth Campus: High Street Deritend, Digbeth, Birmingham B5 5SU
 5. Fusion Centre: 334 - 339 Bradford Street, Digbeth, Birmingham B5 6ES
 6. Golden Hillock Women's Centre: 103 - 105 Golden Hillock Road, Small Heath, Birmingham B10 0DP
 7. Hall Green Campus: Cole Bank Road, Hall Green, Birmingham B28 8ES
 8. Handsworth Campus: Soho Road, Handsworth, Birmingham B21 9DP

References

External links
South & City College Birmingham website
South & City College Birmingham Google+ Page

Further education colleges in Birmingham, West Midlands